Bessy Argyraki is a Greek pop singer who started her career in the mid 1970s and recorded albums until the mid '90s. She has represented Greece in many International festivals and won many prizes. She has released a single and an album in Japan. The single "toshihiko" entered the Japanese Singles' TOP 10. She is married to a doctor and she is a member of the city council in Glyfada.

Argyraki is best known for representing Greece in the  Eurovision Song Contest 1977 and also for her covers of many European hits. Her covers include songs by France Gall, Raffaella Carrà, Kim Wilde and Dolly Parton. During the 1970s and the '80s Argyraki was one of the most popular performers in Greece.

References

External links
 
 Official page on Facebook

1957 births
Living people
Greek pop singers
20th-century Greek women singers
Eurovision Song Contest entrants of 1977
Eurovision Song Contest entrants for Greece
Singers from Athens